BBC Sessions 1968–1970 is a 2011 live compilation album featuring performances by the British hard rock band Deep Purple that were recorded at the BBC's Maida Vale Studios, London, and originally broadcast on various BBC Radio shows from 1968 through 1970. BBC Sessions 1968–1970 is a two-disc set collecting all the surviving sessions in the BBC archives.

Track listing
All songs written by Ritchie Blackmore, Ian Gillan, Roger Glover, Jon Lord and Ian Paice except where noted.

† indicates previously unreleased material

Disc 1, Tracks 5, 7 and 10 first released on a re-issue of The Book of Taliesyn (EMI 72435 21608 2 2, 2000)
Disc 1, Tracks 6, 11 and 12 first released on a re-issue of Deep Purple (EMI 72435 21597 2 7, 2000)
Disc 1, Track 9 first released on a re-issue of Shades of Deep Purple (EMI 72434 98336 2 3, 2000)
Disc 2, Tracks 1–9 and 11–12 first released on Listen, Learn, Read On boxed set (EMI 72435 40973 2 4, 2002)
Disc 2, Track 10 first released on The Anthology (Harvest EN 26 0612 3, 1985)

Personnel
Deep Purple

Mark I (Disc one)
 Ritchie Blackmore – guitar
 Rod Evans – lead vocals
 Jon Lord – organ, keyboards, backing vocals
 Ian Paice – drums
 Nick Simper – bass, backing vocals

Mark II (Disc two)
 Ritchie Blackmore – lead guitar
 Ian Gillan – vocals
 Roger Glover – bass
 Jon Lord – organ, keyboards
 Ian Paice – drums
 Digitally remastered by Peter Mew at Abbey Road Studios, London specifically for this set.

Charts

External links
 BBC Sessions 1968–1970 at Amazon

2011 compilation albums
2011 live albums
BBC Radio recordings
Deep Purple compilation albums
Deep Purple live albums